Walnut Bottom is an unincorporated community in Cumberland County, Pennsylvania, United States. Walnut Bottom has a post office, with ZIP code 17266, which opened on January 14, 1850.

References

Unincorporated communities in Cumberland County, Pennsylvania
Unincorporated communities in Pennsylvania